Aloha State Park is a public recreation area located  south of Cheboygan in Cheboygan County, Michigan.

History
The park was created when Cheboygan County purchased an initial eight acres of abandoned land that had been a park created by the Detroit and Mackinac Railway. The county added another twenty acres to that holding in order to reach the 28-acre minimum required for the establishment of a state park. All of it was donated to the state in 1923.

Activities and amenities
The park offers camping, boating, swimming, and fishing, and is skirted by the North Eastern State Trail. The trail preserves the roadbed of the railroad that set aside the parcel of land used to help create the park.

References

External links
Aloha State Park Michigan Department of Natural Resources 
Aloha State Park Map Michigan Department of Natural Resources

State parks of Michigan
Protected areas of Cheboygan County, Michigan
Protected areas established in 1923
1923 establishments in Michigan